KCKV (91.9 FM) is a radio station broadcasting a Christian Contemporary Music format, licensed to Kirksville, Missouri, United States. The station is currently owned by Lake Area Educational Broadcasting Foundation.

References

External links
 KCKV's website
 

CKV